Rey del Ring (2011) (Spanish for "King of the Ring") was an annual professional wrestling major event produced by Mexican professional wrestling promotion International Wrestling Revolution Group (IWRG), which took place on June 16, 2011, in Arena Naucalpan, Naucalpan, State of Mexico, Mexico. The main event of the show was the Eponymous IWRG Rey del Ring tournament, the ninth version of the annual tournament, which is IWRG's version of WWE's Royal Rumble event. The Rey del Ring returned to IWRG's regular schedule in 2011 after no event was held in 2010, making the event the 10th overall tournament since 2002.

Production

Background
The Mexican professional wrestling company International Wrestling Revolution Group (IWRG; at times referred to as Grupo Internacional Revolución in Mexico) started their annual Rey del Ring ("King of the Ring") event in 2002, creating an annual event around the eponymous Rey del Ring match, a 30-man elimination match similar in concept to the WWE's Royal Rumble match. From 2002 until the 2011 event the "prize" for winning the match itself was simply the prestige of outlasting 29 other competitors, but at the 2011 Rey del Ring IWRG introduced the IWR Rey del Ring Championship complete with a belt to symbolize the championship that would be awarded to the winner each year. At that point in time the Rey del Ring title became a championship that could be defended and lost or won in matches in between the annual tournaments. For the tournament the champion would vacate the Rey del Ring Championship prior to the actual Rey del Ring match itself. All Rey del Ring shows, as well as the majority of the IWRG shows in general are held in "Arena Naucalpan", owned by the promoters of IWRG and their main arena. The 2011 Rey del Ring was the ninth over all Rey del Ring tournament held by IWRG.

Storylines
The event featured three professional wrestling matches with different wrestlers involved in pre-existing scripted feuds, plots and storylines. Wrestlers were portrayed as either heels (referred to as rudos in Mexico, those that portray the "bad guys") or faces (técnicos in Mexico, the "good guy" characters) as they followed a series of tension-building events, which culminated in a wrestling match or series of matches.

Aftermath
Pantera made the first ever Rey del Ring Championship defense on July 10, 2011, when he defeated Último Gladiador to retain the championship. The championship was vacated on the day of the 2012 Rey del Ring tournament so that the winner of the tournament could become the new Rey del Ring Champion at the same time.

Results

2011 Rey del Ring entrants and eliminations
Key

References

External links
IWRG official website

2011 in professional wrestling
2011 in Mexico
IWRG Rey del Ring
June 2011 events in Mexico